Israel Yosef Kniazer (1 April 1894 – 4 May 1958) was an Israeli chess player.

Biography
During the 1930s Israel Kniazer immigrants from Poland to Mandatory Palestine and was active in chess. He participated in several chess tournaments held in Tel Aviv.

In 1951, Israel Kniazer participated in the Israeli Chess Championship and finished in 2nd place. In 1953, he participated in the Israeli Chess Championship and shared 2nd – 3rd places.

Israel Kniazer played for Israel in the Chess Olympiad:
 In 1954, at first reserve board in the 11th Chess Olympiad in Amsterdam (+0, =8, -1).

References

External links

Israel Kniazer chess games at 365chess.com

1894 births
1958 deaths
Israeli chess players
Chess Olympiad competitors
Polish emigrants to Mandatory Palestine